John Forrest (born 1878) was a Scottish footballer who played in the Football League for Bradford City and Stoke as a forward.

Career
Forrest was born in Lanarkshire and played for Carluke Milton Rovers and Motherwell before being signed by Stoke in 1902 after being highly recommended by the club's Scotland-based scouts. He began his Stoke career brilliantly, scoring twice on his debut in a 3–0 win over Staffordshire rivals Wolverhampton Wanderers, and scored his third against Liverpool two matches later. However after the first month at the club he began to feel homesick and was allowed to return to Scotland. He played once in November and then in April before the board had enough of Forrest and told him to leave.

In May 1903 he joined the newly formed league club Bradford City taking his place in the club's first line-up against Grimsby Town on 1 September 1903. He spent a little over two seasons at Bradford, scoring 18 goals in 53 league games and being the club's top goalscorer in 1904–05. He also scored six goals from just five FA Cup games including four in a 9–0 win over Sunderland West End on 10 December 1905.

In January 1906 he left to join Hamilton Academical, where his 18-month spell included scoring a brace to eliminate local rivals and former employers Motherwell from the Scottish Cup on his debut, and later some minor silverware with a Lanarkshire Cup win. He then moved on to Ayr followed by Vale of Leven.

Career statistics
Source:

References

Year of death missing
Scottish footballers
Footballers from South Lanarkshire
English Football League players
Scottish Football League players
Stoke City F.C. players
Motherwell F.C. players
Ayr F.C. players
Vale of Leven F.C. players
Bradford City A.F.C. players
Hamilton Academical F.C. players
1878 births
Association football forwards